Thirumanilaiyur Sitapati Ramana Subramanian (11 December 1938 – 26 February 2018) was an Indian bureaucrat who served as the cabinet secretary of India from August 1996 to March 1998. He was a 1961 batch Indian Administrative Service officer from Uttar Pradesh Cadre.

Early life and education
He was born into a middle class Tamil family and had spent much of his schooling days in Thanjavur, Tamil nadu. Subramanian has a master's degree from Calcutta University, and has studied at the Imperial College London (officially Imperial College of Science, Technology and Medicine). He also held a master's degree in Public Administration from Harvard University.

Career
Subramanian served in the Indian Administrative Service, where he held various positions including that of Cabinet Secretary (1 August 1996 to 31 March 1998), the highest post in the Indian administration and the post of Secretary in the Ministry of Textiles. He was Non-Executive Director of HCL Technologies from September 1999 to November 2011. He was a founder member and former Chancellor of the Shiv Nadar University. He held directorships for a few companies like HCL and SABMiller. He was also Founder Chairperson, VidyaGyan Leadership Academy & Trustee, Shiv Nadar Foundation.

Remarks
On 31 October 2013, the Supreme Court's decision in T.S.R. Subramaniam v. Union of India drastically reduced political pressure on top bureaucrats by ruling that they must get an assured minimum tenure in posting. Additionally, the Court held that civil servants were not bound to follow oral directives from the Government. "Fixed tenure of bureaucrats will promote professionalism, efficiency and good governance," bench observed. "Much of the deterioration in the functioning of bureaucracy is due to political interference," the SC said. The SC also directed the Centre and state governments to pass an order within three months on giving fixed tenure to civil servants. The PIL filed by 83 retired bureaucrats including former cabinet secretary T S R Subramanian seeking its directions for insulating bureaucracy from political interference. "This is a landmark judgement. Public servants are not private servants," Subramanian said.

Works
 India at Turning Point: The Road to Good Governance  
 GovernMint In India: An Inside View (2009) 
 Journeys Through Babudom and Netaland: Governance in India (2004)

References

External links
 Shiv Nadar University official website

1938 births
2018 deaths
University of Calcutta alumni
Cabinet Secretaries of India
Alumni of Imperial College London
Harvard Kennedy School alumni
Indian Administrative Service officers
People from Thanjavur